Waterfoot is the name of several villages in the United Kingdom:

 Waterfoot, County Antrim, Northern Ireland
 Waterfoot, Argyll and Bute, a location in Scotland
 Waterfoot, Cumbria, a location in England
 Waterfoot, East Renfrewshire, Scotland
 Waterfoot, Lancashire, England